Zarrin Ju (also Romanized as Zarrīn Jū; also known as Qal‘eh Pahn Bas and Zarrīn Jūb) is a village in Howmeh-ye Sarpol Rural District, in the Central District of Sarpol-e Zahab County, Kermanshah Province, Iran. At the 2006 census, its population was 102, in 24 families.

References 

Populated places in Sarpol-e Zahab County